"Lookbook.nu" is a fashion, youth culture, and community website, created by Yuri Lee in San Francisco. It was inspired by street fashion websites and blogs such as The Sartorialist and The Cobrasnake and designed for users to post their own street-fashion photography, featuring themselves and their outfits. The site has been called the "Digg.com for fashion insiders."

Lookbook
The website is free and allows everyone to join (a change from their original invitation-only system). It allows users to share their looks and activity in Facebook, Twitter and Tumblr. Their goal is to provide a means for diverse, real people to provide fashion inspiration to others.

Lookbook.nu claims to have a user base of over 50,000 members and over one million unique hits per month. It has been discussed in major fashion and media outlets, including The Chicago Tribune, Elle Belgium, Status magazine, and the London Evening Standard,.

Site features
Outfits - or "looks" - uploaded to the site by its members are scored with points, known as "hype," to judge that outfit's popularity. This scoring system is used to differentiate between the looks on a basis of what is called "karma." Karma is the average of the total number of hypes a user has received, divided by the number of different looks that user has posted. This karmic average on the site dictates how much exposure that user will receive when posting new looks.

Looks are displayed a variety of different ways on the website. The default view of the site is via the Hot tab, which shows those looks which are most popular on the site, judged by the amount of hype it has received, and its popularity on that day in competition with other looks. A second tab, New, shows all looks uploaded, with the most recent shown first. The New tab offers a feature known as the Karma Filter, which allows for users with a higher karmic average to be featured more prominently on the feed. The Top tab features the most popular Looks posted - and can be sorted by day/week/month/year.

Registered users (on the site as well through third-party services such as Facebook and Twitter), are allowed the option of hyping and commenting on the looks posted by other members. Hyping is done anonymously to encourage all users to hype, but a user may make their hype public by leaving the member a comment. Members are also allowed to give Love - symbolized with a ♥ - for looks that they especially like, and are also given an archive of the looks they have previously hyped and loved. Users are also allowed to become "fans" of other users.

Lookbook.nu also has a forum where users can post topics and join discussions. Users continue to have the ability to invite new members.

References

External links

Photoblogs
Fashion websites
American photography websites
Internet properties established in 2008